The List of Mount Rainier National Park references identifies English language historic, scientific, ecological, cultural, tourism, social, and advocacy books, journals and studies on the subject of Mount Rainier National Park topics published since 1899 and documented in Mount Rainier related bibliographies and other related references.

History

Park management

Wildlife

Geology and geography

Historic structures

Tourism and recreation

Mountaineering

Photography

Notes

External links

Mount Rainier National Park
Mount Rainier National Park